The following is a list of lieutenant governors of the United States Virgin Islands.

Elected lieutenant governors (1969–present)
 Parties

References

External links
VI History.com

Lieutenant Governor